Brydan Klein and Joe Salisbury were the defending champions but chose not to defend their title.

Marcelo Arévalo and Roberto Maytín won the title after defeating Robert Galloway and Nathan Pasha 6–3, 6–3 in the final.

Seeds

Draw

References
 Main Draw
 Qualifying Draw

Las Vegas Challenger - Doubles
Las Vegas Challenger